Josef Erler (9 February 1804, Brixen - 31 March 1844, Innsbruck) was an Austrian landscape painter.

Life and work 
He received his first drawing lessons in Brixen from a local artist named Josef Tauber. With the help of some friends, he was able to enroll at the Academy of Fine Arts, Vienna, in 1825. He would study there intermittently for eleven years. During this time, he was awarded the Gundel-Prize for excellence (1827), and the Lampi-Prize for drawing from nature.

He returned to Brixen in 1836 and died while visiting Innsbruck, at the age of only forty.

He created history paintings, portraits and, above all, landscapes. His works have been largely forgotten, and are of interest mainly for their historical value.

Sources 
 Constantin von Wurzbach: "Erler, Joseph". In: Biographisches Lexikon des Kaiserthums Oesterreich. Vol.4 Verlag L. C. Zamarski, 1858, pg. 72 (Online)

External links

1804 births
1844 deaths
Austrian painters
Austrian landscape painters
Academy of Fine Arts Vienna alumni
People from Brixen